Dolya may refer to:

Places 
  a village in Svatove Raion, Ukraine
 , a village in Volnovakha Raion, Ukraine
 Dolya Tessera, a geological feature on Venus

Other uses 
 Dolya (unit), an old Russian unit of mass
 , or Dola, a figure in Slavic mythology
 "Fate" (Ukrainian: Dolya), a poem by Taras Shevchenko
 Galina Dolya, Soviet athlete
 Dolya Gavanski, actress and director

See also 
 Dolia (disambiguation)
 Dolja (disambiguation)